"Not That Different" is a song written by Julian Williams,Karen Taylor-Good and Joie Scott, and recorded by American country music singer Collin Raye. It was released in November 1995 the second single from his album I Think About You. It also peaked at number 14 on the Billboard Bubbling Under Hot 100.

Critical reception
Chuck Taylor, of Billboard magazine reviewed the song favorably saying that the song touches "people where they live, love, and hope." He goes on to say that Raye gives a "flawless performance."

Music video
The music video was directed by Steven Goldmann and premiered in late 1995.

Chart positions

Year-end charts

References

1995 singles
1995 songs
Collin Raye songs
Song recordings produced by Paul Worley
Songs written by Karen Taylor-Good
Epic Records singles
Music videos directed by Steven Goldmann